Obi Castle is a Japanese castle, which was originally completed in 1588. It was founded by the Tsuchimochi clan in Nanboku-cho Period, but most of its structure comes from the mid-1400s.

It featured prominently in conflicts between the Ito and Shimazu Clan. It was in initially in Shimazu hands, until lost to the Ito clan in 1587. The Ito clan continued to rule it until the Meiji period, expanding it and making it more defendable, with the castle town protected on three sides by the Sakatani river. A domain called Obi Domain was ruled from the castle.

After some neglect, the castle was completely refurbished in the late 1970s.

During the castle refurbishment, work was also done on the castle town. The work on the town brings it into line, in terms of historical authenticity, with the era of the castle, so the town and castle currently are authentically reflective of a castle town dating from the Edo period.

References 

Castles in Miyazaki Prefecture